Proeulia paronerata is a species of moth of the family Tortricidae. It is found in the Valparaíso Region of Chile.

The wingspan is 19–21 mm. The ground colour of the forewings is cream white, suffused with pale ochreous cream and cream and sprinkled with brownish grey, grey and with brownish in the dorsal portion of the wing. The hindwings are cream, in the basal half mixed with pale brownish. The forewings of the females are whitish, strigulated (finely streaked) with olive cream suffused with grey in the terminal third.

Etymology
The species name refers to the similarity with Proeulia onerata, plus the Greek prefix par (meaning near).

References

Moths described in 2010
Proeulia
Moths of South America
Taxa named by Józef Razowski
Endemic fauna of Chile